This is a list of cassava dishes that use cassava as a main ingredient. The cassava is a woody shrub native to South America of the spurge family.
It is extensively cultivated as an annual crop in tropical and subtropical regions.

Cassava dishes

See also
Cassava-based dishes

Cassava Dishes